The London Conference of 1946–1947, which took place between September 1946 and February 1947, was called by the British Government of Clement Attlee to resolve the future governance of Palestine and negotiate an end of the Mandate. It was scheduled following an Arab request after the April 1946 Anglo-American Committee of Inquiry report.

A press statement made by President Truman on October 4 advocating for the Jewish Agency proposal effectively "torpedoed" British plans for the conference.

Bevin blamed Truman for the failure of the conference in a speech a week after he announced its failure; according to Professor Arieh Kochavi, "Bevin was furious at what he regarded as the President's bowing to American Jewish political pressure." Bevin's speech was widely attacked in the United States. Truman commented on the matter in detail in his memoirs.

Background
The Council of the Arab League had met at the Bloudan Conference of 1946 to consider the Anglo-American Committee of Inquiry report which had been published on 20 April 1946; recommendations resulting from this conference were sent to the British government. The Arab governments invited the British government to meet in order to reach an agreement ahead of the upcoming second meeting of the First session of the United Nations General Assembly:
... the conclusion of an agreement which will put an end to the present situation in Palestine and transform it into one in conformity with the provisions of the Charter and agreeable with its aims ... before the next Session of the General Assembly to be held in September, 1946

First conference: Arab League

The British government issued invitations on 25 July 1946, just three days after the King David Hotel bombing, to the Governments of the member countries of the Arab League, the Jewish Agency for Palestine and to the Palestine Arab Higher Executive. Subsequently Abdul Rahman Hassan Azzam, the Secretary General of the Arab League as well as "prominent Palestinian Arabs" and "representatives of Jewish opinion in the United Kingdom and in Palestine" were invited. Neither the Jewish Agency for Palestine nor the Palestine Arab Higher Executive accepted the invitations.

The conference began on 9 September 1946, with only representatives of the Arab States in attendance, but without Jewish or Palestinian representatives.

The first item for discussion was the Morrison–Grady Plan, which was to be rejected by all parties.

The British government later described the Arab reaction to the plan:
The Arab Delegates at once made it clear that they were opposed to this plan in principle and could not accept it as a basis for discussion. They criticized many of its features; but was clear that, fundamentally, their rejection of this solution was based on their conviction that any scheme of provincial autonomy would inevitably lead to partition.

The alternative plan put forward by the Arab states consisted of the following:(a)	Palestine would be a unitary State with a permanent Arab majority, and would attain its independence as such after a short period of transition (two or three years) under British Mandate.
(b)	Within this unitary State, Jews who had acquired Palestinian citizenship (for which the qualification would be ten years’ residence in the country) would have full civil rights, equally with all other citizens of Palestine.
(c)	Special safeguards would be provided to protect the religious and cultural rights of the Jewish community.
(d)	The sanctity of the Holy Places would be guaranteed and safeguards provided for freedom of religious practice throughout Palestine.
(e)	The Jewish community would be entitled to a number of seats in the legislative Assembly proportionate to the number of Jewish citizens (as defined) in Palestine, subject to the proviso that in no case would the number of Jewish representatives exceed one third of the total number of members.
(f)	All legislation concerning immigration and the transfer of land would require the consent of the Arabs in Palestine as expressed by a majority of the Arab members of the Legislative Assembly.
(g)	The guarantees concerning the Holy Places would be alterable only with the consent of the United Nations; and the safeguards provided for the Jewish community would be alterable only with the consent of a majority of the Jewish Members of the Legislative Assembly.

In early October the Conference was adjourned at the beginning of October as a result of the United Nations General Assembly meetings in New York; it then reassembled on 27 January 1947.

22nd World Zionist Congress
While the conference was on hold, the 22nd World Zionist Congress was held in Basle between 9 and 24 December 1946.

The congress described the Morrison-Grady plan as "a travesty of Britain’s obligations under the Mandate", unacceptable as a basis for discussion, and confirmed that the Zionist Organization could not "in the existing circumstances" participate in the London conference. The congress's demands were that:(i)	that Palestine be established as a Jewish commonwealth integrated in the structure of the democratic world;
(ii)	that the gates of Palestine be opened to Jewish immigration;
(iii)	that the Jewish Agency be vested with the control of immigration into Palestine and with the necessary authority for the upbuilding of the country.

Second conference: Arab League and Palestine Higher Executive, with parallel Jewish Agency discussions

The conference restarted in January 1947. This time, a Delegation representing the Palestine Arab Higher Executive joined the Arab League states, and Jewish Agency representatives engaged in parallel via informal conversations with the British government. On 7 February 1947 the British government submitted a new proposal to all parties. The plan proposed a five-year British trusteeship over Palestine with the intention to prepare the country for independence.

The new proposals were later summarized by the British government as follows:
The proposed terms of trusteeship would include provision for a substantial measure of local autonomy in areas so delimited as to include a substantial majority either of Jews or of Arabs. The High Commissioner would retain responsibility for protecting the minorities in these areas. At the centre, the High commissioner would endeavour to form a representative Advisory council. At the end of four years, a Constituent Assembly would be elected. If agreement was reached between a majority of the Arab representatives a majority of the Jewish representatives in this Assembly, an independent State would be established without delay. In the event of disagreement, the Trusteeship Council of the United Nations would be asked to advise upon future procedure.

The new British proposal was rejected by all parties – the Jewish Agency, the Palestine Arab Higher Executive and the Arab countries. The Jewish Agency requested that Palestine should become a Jewish State, that Jewish immigration should be permitted up to the full extent of the country's economic absorptive capacity and “a viable Jewish State in an adequate area of Palestine.”

Outcome
On 18 February 1947, immediately following the conference, foreign secretary Ernest Bevin announced that Britain was unable to solve the problem and would pass it to the United Nations to propose a solution:
His Majesty's Government have of themselves no power, under the terms of the Mandate, to award the country either to the Arabs or to the Jews, or even to partition it between them. It is in these circumstances that we have decided that we are unable to accept the scheme put forward either by the Arabs or by the Jews, or to impose ourselves a solution of our own. We have, therefore, reached the conclusion that the only course now open to us is to submit the problem to the judgment of the United Nations. We intend to place before them an historical account of the way in which His Majesty's Government have discharged their trust in Palestine over the last 25 years. We shall explain that the Mandate has proved to be unworkable in practice, and that the obligations undertaken to the two communities in Palestine have been shown to be irreconcilable. We shall describe the various proposals which have been put forward for dealing with the situation, namely, the Arab Plan, the Zionists' aspirations, so far as we have been able to ascertain them, the proposals of the Anglo-American Committee, and the various proposals which we ourselves have put forward. We shall then ask the United Nations to consider our report, and to recommend a settlement of the problem. We do not intend ourselves to recommend any particular solution.

The United Nations Special Committee on Palestine was formed on 15 May 1947.

On 4 October 1945, it is mentioned in the British Cabinet's minutes that the foreign secretary would propose a solution before passing it along to the United Nations.

Notes

Bibliography
 H. Levenberg, Bevin's Disillusionment: The London Conference, Autumn 1946, Middle Eastern Studies, Vol. 27, No. 4 (Oct., 1991), pp. 615–630
 
Abcarius, M.F. (nd) Palestine. Through the Fog of Propaganda. Hutchinson.
Cohen, Aharon (1970) Israel and the Arab World. W.H. Allen. .
Israel Pocket Library (1973) History From 1880. Ketter Books, Jerusalem.
Kayyali, Abdul-Wahhab Said (1981) Palestine. A Modern History Croom Helm. .
Segev, Tom (2000) One Palestine, Complete - Jews and Arabs under the British Mandate. Little, Brown & Co. .
Teveth, Shabtai (1987) Ben-Gurion. The Burning Ground. 1886–1948. Houghton Mifflin. .
Weizmann, Chaim (1949) Trial and Error. Hamish Hamilton. (2nd edition. April 1949).
 The Political History of Palestine under British Administration His Britannic Majesty's Government, Presented in 1947 to the United Nations Special Committee on Palestine, Jerusalem, 1947

External sources
 Pathe Newsreel of Conference Opening

1940s in Mandatory Palestine
1946 conferences
1947 conferences
Diplomatic conferences in the United Kingdom
History of Palestine (region)
Mandatory Palestine
1940s in the City of Westminster
Conferences in London